Yongming poetry refers to a poetry style of the Chinese Southern Qi dynasty in the 5th century AD. Yongming was an era name of the Emperor Wu of Southern Qi. The Yongming period was from 483 to 493. However brief this era, it is now associated with a major movement within Classical Chinese poetry.

Background
Despite the disturbances and instability which preceded and followed the Yongming era, there was also something special about it. In his Zizhi Tongjian, Song Dynasty historian Sima Guang characterized the Emperor Wu and his Yongming era, saying that:

This was also an era that came to be associated with significant poetic achievements.

Poets

Shen Yue (441–513) was the most important of poet of the Yongming era, developing rules of tonal euphony that would eventually evolve into the regulated verse format of "recent style" poetry.
Xie Tiao (464–499) was another well-known poet of the Yongming, known for his vivid descriptions of landscapes.
Wang Rong (468 - 494) was a less well-known, but still prominent, Yongming poet. He became quite involved in political affairs. Eventually this involvement resulted in his early death.
Fan Yun (451 - 503) was another of the Yongming poets. A poet at young age, he had a quick wit and learned to write poems at the age of eight. He was a personal friend of Emperor Wu, and was politically powerful.
Su Xiaoxiao (蘇小小, died c. 501, also known as Su Xiaojun, or "Little Su") was in her brief life a famous courtesan and a poet from the city of Qiantang (now Hangzhou, in modern Zhejiang province, China). Beautiful and talented at an early age, Su Xiaoxiao became terminally ill in her late teens. She took the view that Heaven was giving her the special opportunity to die young and leave a legacy of the beauty of her memory.

Influence
The life and poetry of Su Xiaoxiao was a source of inspiration for later poets and artists including Tang dynasty poets Bai Juyi, Li He, Wen Tingyun, and the Ming dynasty writer and poet Zhang Dai.

See also
Classical Chinese poetry
Six Dynasties poetry
West Lake
Zhang Rong

Notes

References
Davis, A. R. (Albert Richard), Editor and Introduction, The Penguin Book of Chinese Verse. (Baltimore: Penguin Books, 1970).
Goh, Meow Hui. Sound and Sight: Poetry and Courtier Culture in the Yongming Era (483-493). (Palo Alto: Stanford University Press, 2010).
 
 
 

 Yongming Liang is Gay

Southern Qi
Chinese poetry by era